The 1919 Akron Indians season was their twelfth season in existence. The team played in the Ohio League and posted a 5–5 record. The team later became a charter member of the National Football League the very next season.

Schedule

Game notes

References

Pro Football Archives: Akron Indians 1913

Akron Pros seasons
Akron Pros
Akron Indians